Nakhl may refer to:
 Nakhl-e Ghanem, a village in Howmeh Rural District, in the Central District of Kangan County, Bushehr Province, Iran
 Nakhl-e Yusef, a village in Moghuyeh Rural District, in the Central District of Bandar Lengeh County, Hormozgan Province, Iran
 Nakhal, a town in Al Batinah Region in Oman
 Nekhel, also spelt Nakhl, the capital of Nekhel Municipality of North Sinai Governorate, Sinai, Egypt